Aboubacar Camara may refer to:

 Aboubacar Camara (dancer), dancer, choreographer, teacher with Dance Alloy
 Aboubacar Camara (footballer, born 1988), Guinean football midfielder for Sidi Bouzid
 Aboubacar Camara (footballer, born 1993), goalkeeper for the Guinea national football team and CD Huétor Tájar
 Aboubacar Bwanga Camara (born 1986), football defender for the Guinea national football team and AS Kaloum Star
 Aboubacar Demba Camara (1944–1973), Guinean singer-songwriter
 Aboubacar Demba Camara (footballer) (born 1994), Guinean football striker for Troyes AC
 Aboubacar Leo Camara (born 1993), football defender for the Guinea national football team and Al-Ansar SC
 Aboubacar M'Baye Camara (born 1985), Guinean football midfielder for RFC Meux
 Aboubacar Sidiki Camara (born 1972), Guinean football forward, played in France and England
 Aboubacar Sidiki Camara (politician), Guinean defence minister
 Bouba Camara (born 1976), Guinean football forward for US lower league teams such as the Long Island Rough Riders